Sports Story is a 2022 video game developed and published by Sidebar Games for the Nintendo Switch. It is the sequel to the 2017 video game Golf Story. It was released on 23 December 2022. 

Originally announced in December 2019, Sports Story suffered delays as the scope of the game became more ambitious. Upon release the game received mixed reviews, with criticism directed towards the game's overuse of fetch quests, its unfocused narrative, and technical issues experienced at launch, with most critics finding the game to be inferior to Golf Story.

Gameplay
Sports Story is a top-down adventure game following the protagonist of the original game investigating the suspicious activities of the PureStrike megacorporation and the Iron Dragons yakuza. Compared to Golf Story, which only featured gameplay revolving around the sport of golf, Sports Story features additional sports including tennis, association football, cricket, volleyball and BMX. The game uses mechanics based on these sports as part of its gameplay, which includes minigames, dungeon crawling and stealth segments. The game also features a fleshed out tennis academy storyline separate to the main story.

Development and release
The game was announced on 10 December 2019 in a Nintendo Indie World showcase for an intended 2020 release. Similarly to the development of Golf Story, Sports Story was delayed a number of times as the scope of the game became more ambitious. It was ultimately released on 23 December 2022.

The initial release of the game contained a secret room (ostensibly a game development office) in which its occupants complained about an unnamed project's "troubled development", with some publications surmising that the comments referred to the protracted development of Sports Story itself. A later patch, while acknowledging the secret room, blocked player access to it and altered the occupants' dialogue to be more positive, albeit in a sarcastic manner.

Reception

The game received "mixed or average reviews" according to media review aggregator website Metacritic, based on 13 critic reviews. Most critics found the game to be inferior to its predecessor.

Nintendo Life's mixed review praised Sports Story's writing and visuals, but they had issues with the game's numerous bugs and glitches, overuse of fetch quests, and its sometimes confusing quest structure. Siliconera criticized the lack of tutorials and its unfocused narrative, and felt parts of the game were "blatantly broken". GameSpot's negative review also criticised the fetch quests and the story, as well as the technical issues and the poor implementation of the new sports into the game, but found the golf to be the best part of the game. Vooks also felt the golf-focused parts of the game were still fun, and ultimately found the game to be "greater than the sum of its wobbly parts".

References

2022 video games
Multiple-sport video games
Nintendo Switch games
Nintendo Switch-only games
Role-playing video games
Video games developed in Australia
Multiplayer and single-player video games